The Federal Authority for Railway Accident Investigation (BEU) is an agency of the Government of Germany charged with investigating rail accidents. Its head office is in the Federal Ministry of Transport and Digital Infrastructure (BMVI) Robert-Schuman-Platz 1 office building in Bonn.

References

External links

 Federal Authority for Railway Accident Investigation
"Accident Investigation." Federal Railway Authority
Official English name

German federal agencies
Germany